The 2006 New Zealand rugby union tour of Argentina and Europe was a series of matches played in June 2006 in Argentina and in November in England France and Wales by New Zealand national rugby union team, that won all five match

In Argentina
One match played in June in Argentina: the All Blacks came from behind at half-time to defeat Argentina at José Amalfitani Stadium in Buenos Aires. The All Blacks had just completed a two to nil test series win over Ireland, and Argentina had were also coming off a two test series win, over Wales. 15 of New Zealand's 25 points came from Daniel Carter.

Argentina moved to an early lead with Federico Todeschini kicking a penalty goal after five minutes of play. The scores were levelled by Daniel Carter in the 9th minute with a penalty goal for New Zealand. Full-back Leon MacDonald scored the first try of the match to put the All Blacks in front. A successful penalty goal by Todeschini in the 18th minute narrowed the All Blacks' lead. Argentina moved in front with a try to Martín Durand in the 20th minute, with Todeschini adding the conversion. Argentina's lead was extended with another successful penalty goal by Todeschini in the 29th minute. The All Blacks were able to fight back in the remaining ten minutes of the first half, with a try to Carter in the 30th minute, which he also converted. Argentina entered half-time, leading 16 to 15.

The All Blacks picked up where they left off in the latter stages of the first half, with a try to Scott Hamilton eight minutes into the second half, which was converted by Carter. Todeschini was successful with penalty goal in the 52nd minute, as was Carter for the All Blacks five minutes later. Two yellow cards were given out during the last fifteen minutes of the game with José María Núñez Piossek of Argentina getting the first, and All Blacks' try scorer McDonald getting one a few minutes later. The score remained 25 to 19 through to the end of the match to see the All Blacks hold onto the win.

Match details

In Europe

First test: England 
After the victory in the 2006 Tri Nations, the All Blacks unbeaten in 2006, came in Europe to play four tests, with England, France (twice) and Wales.

Second test: France

Third Test: France

Fourth test: Wales

References

2006 rugby union tours
2006 in New Zealand rugby union
2006
2006 in Argentine rugby union
2006–07 in European rugby union
2006–07 in English rugby union
2006–07 in French rugby union
2006–07 in Welsh rugby union
2006
2006
2006
2006